FREJA was a Swedish satellite developed by the Swedish Space Corporation on behalf of the Swedish National Space Board. It was piggyback launched on a Long March 2C launch vehicle from Jiuquan Satellite Launch Center in China on October 6, 1992. The satellite's total cost was 19 million U.S. dollars, excluding the costs of experiments.

It was funded with Swedish tax money through the Swedish National Space Board, donations from the Wallenberg Foundation and approximately 25% from the German Ministry for Science and Technology.

Experiments (payload) 
 (F1) Electric Fields, Royal Institute of Technology, Sweden
 (F2) Magnetic Fields, Applied Physics Laboratory/Johns Hopkins University, United States
 (F3C) Cold Plasma, National Research Council of Canada, Canada
 (F3H) Particles; Hot Plasma, Swedish Institute of Space Physics, Kiruna, Sweden
 (F4) Waves, Swedish Institute of Space Physics, Uppsala, Sweden
 (F5) Auroral Imager, University of Calgary, Canada
 (F6) Electron Beam, Max-Planck Institute, Germany
 (F7) Particle Correlator, Max-Planck Institute, Germany

See also 

 Viking (satellite)

References

External links 
 Freja at Swedish Space Corporation
 Freja at Astronautix

Satellites orbiting Earth
Geospace monitoring satellites
Space programme of Sweden
Science and technology in Sweden
Spacecraft launched in 1992